The 1st Indonesian Choice Awards (Official name: NET. ONE presents Indonesian Choice Awards 2014) was an annual awards ceremony held on May 18, 2014, at the Mata Elang International Stadium in Pademangan, North Jakarta. The show was hosted by Sarah Sechan and Boy William. This awards ceremony coincided with the first anniversary of the sponsor TV channel NET., entitled Net. ONE.

Raisa was the biggest winner of the night, with three awards for "Female Singer of the Year", "Album of the Year" for Heart to Heart, and "Song of the Year" for "Pemeran Utama". Other winners included Fatin Shidqia, who won "Breakthrough of the Year", Superman Is Dead, who won "Group/Band/Duo of the Year", Tulus, who won "Male Singer of the Year", etc.

Legend of singer-songwriter, Iwan Fals, receiving the special award "Lifetime Achievement Award" for his contribution for 35 years in the world of Indonesian music.

In addition to local musician, NET. also features international musicians and artists, such as Far East Movement, Ne-Yo and Japanese comical magician Gamarjobat.

Voting system
Voting for the 2014 Indonesian Choice Awards began on April 30, 2014. Members of the public could cast their votes via Twitter or Facebook.

Performances

Presenters
 Chelsea Islan and Bunga Citra Lestari – Presented Male Singer of the Year
 Deva Mahenra and Reza Rahadian – Presented Female Singer of the Year
 Marissa Anita and Armand Maulana – Presented Group/Band/Duo of the Year
 Iko Uwais and Shahnaz Soehartono – Presented Breakthrough Artist of the Year
 Ganindra Bimo and Acha Septriasa – Presented Song of the Year
 Zivanna Letisha and Rio Dewanto – Presented Album of the Year
 Lukman Sardi and Dominique Diyose – Presented TV Program of the Year
 Desta and Vincent Rhompies – Presented Actress of the Year
 Raisa and Gista Putri – Presented Actor of the Year
 Sophia Latjuba and Paula Verhoeven – Presented Movie of the Year
 Agus Lasmono – Presented Lifetime Achievement Award

Winners and nominees
The full list of nominees and winners are as follows:

Music

Film

Television

Special award

References

2014 music awards
Indonesian Choice Awards